This article lists political parties in Hungary. Hungary has a multi-party system since it gained independence following the Revolutions of 1989. Currently, the political landscape of Hungary is dominated by the Fidesz – Hungarian Civic Alliance, which has a supermajority, while the largest party of the opposition is the Democratic Coalition. The opposition constitutes a coalition named United for Hungary against the dominant Fidesz-KDNP alliance, which includes all but two opposition parties in the parliament.

Active parties

Parties represented in the National Assembly or the European Parliament

Parties not represented in the National Assembly or the European Parliament

Historical parties

Before the Hungarian Revolution of 1848

Between the Hungarian Revolution of 1848 and the Ausgleich (1867)
After the Revolution of 1848 three different political directions were created - '47ers, '48ers and '49ers.

During the time of the Austro-Hungarian Empire (1867–1918)

During the First Hungarian Republic (1918–1919, 1919–1920)

During the Kingdom of Hungary (1920–1945)

During the Second Hungarian Republic (1946–1949)

During the Hungarian People's Republic (1949-1989)

During the Third Republic (since 1989)

See also
 Politics of Hungary
 List of political parties by country
 Liberalism and radicalism in Hungary

References

Political parties
Hungary
 
Political parties
Hungary